EPZ is a thana under the Chattogram District in Chattogram Division, Bangladesh.

References 

Thanas of Chittagong District